Sidney Barnes (1916–1973) was an Australian cricketer and cricket writer.

Sidney or Sydney Barnes may also refer to:
Sidney Barnes (musician) (born 1941), American singer and songwriter
Sydney Barnes (1873–1967), English cricketer